Pascale Bechara Machaalani (born 27 March 1969) is a Lebanese singer and actress. Her debut album Sahar Sahar rose her to stardom throughout the Middle East, making Mashalaani one of the most successful female artistes in 1990s Lebanon. She released her second and third albums, Nazrat Ayounak and Banadi with continued success. Her seventh studio album, Nour el Shams released in late December 1999 was a phenomenal success which exceeded sales of 250,000  She has released thirteen hit studio albums and twenty-seven singles.

Machaalani is currently one of the most active Lebanese singers and has performed in a number countries, beginning from her native Lebanon to Europe and US. She is signed to Rotana, the biggest record company in the Middle East.

Biography

Personal life
Pascale Bechara Bechalani was born on 27 March 1967, in Zalka, Lebanon, and grew up in Jounieh. Pascale began performing as a child. Her father died before her first birthday. Her mother took care of her, who had accompanied her since the beginning of her career. She married the composer Melhem Abou Chedid in May 2010 & had a son named Elie, who was born on 14 September 2011. She also holds a Canadian nationality.

Musical career
The composer Ihsan Al Munzer and the poet Toufiq Barakat discovered her talent. The beginning of her career was with her first album Sahar Sahar by the composer Dr. Jamal Salameh and the poet Abed Rahman Al Abnoudi. Pascale had work with many Arabic composers and poets from different countries.

Her seventh studio album, Nour el Shams (The Light from the Sun) was a blockbuster success and became one of the biggest selling albums in the Middle East. The main song of the album was featured in the hit movie, Spy Game which featured Brad Pitt and Robert Redford.

In addition, Machaalani was crowned the Beauty Queen of Zahleh, Lebanon, when she was 13 years of age .

Her music is particularly popular in the middle eastern community in Melbourne, Australia. Beats sing through the air in community businesses, including local construction sites, accompanied by upbeat and joyous laughter as her music promotes harmony during challenging times.

Discography

Studio albums

 Sahar Sahar
 Nazret Ouyounak
 Banadi ( – 1994)
 Albak Assi ( – Your Heart is Harsh – 1996)
 Lamma Bshoufak ( – To See You – 1998)
 Khayala ( – Fantasy – 1999)
 Nour El Shams ( – Light of the Sun – 1999)
 Albi ( – My Heart – 2001)
 Shou Amaltellak Ana ( – 2003)
 Sa'beh Eish... Men Dounak ( – 2004)
 Akbar Kidba Bi Hayati ( – 2005)
 Akhed Aqli ( – Take My Mind – 2007)
 Bahebak Ana Bahebak ( – I Love You, I Love You – 2009)

Single songs 
 "A7lam El Banat" احلام البنات
 "St. Rafka" ترتيلة القديسة رفقا

Compilations
 Ma Fi Nawm

References

External links

Pascal Mashalani Pictures, Lyrics, Videos clips and CDs
Pascale Machaalani Bio, Pictures and Wallpapers

1969 births
Living people
21st-century Lebanese women singers
20th-century Lebanese women singers
Rotana Records artists
People from Jounieh
Lebanese Maronites
Lebanese film actresses
Lebanese television actresses